Biashara United Mara is a football club based at the Karume Football Stadium  in Musoma, Tanzania. They play in the Tanzania  Championship.

History
Biashara United Mara was founded in 1990 known as Police Mara but later in 2013 it was transformed to business club the called Biashara United Mara(BUM). The team started playing in the 4th division in 1995 and got promoted to the first division in 1997. In 1998, the league was restructured and became the Premier League.
The team were promoted to the 2018/19 Mainland Premier League season and season 2021 was their third before relegation.

Squad

References

External links
Profile on soccerway
Profile on livesoccertv
Profile on sofascore
Profile on global sports

Football clubs in Tanzania
 establishments in Tanzania
Musoma